Ken Crawford may refer to:

 Ken Crawford (American football) (1898–?), American football player
 Ken Crawford (baseball) (1894–1976), Major League baseball player
 Ken Crawford (astrophotographer), American astrophotographer
 Sir Kenneth Crawford (1895–1961), British Army general
 Kenneth G. Crawford (1902–1983), American journalist for PM newspaper and Newsweek magazine